Schiaparelli may refer to:

 Schiaparelli (surname), Italian surname
 Schiaparelli (fashion house), founded by Elsa Schiaparelli and later revived

Astronomy
Schiaparelli (lunar crater), a relatively small crater in the LQ10 (Seleucus) quadrangle on the Moon
Schiaparelli (Martian crater), the second-largest definable crater on Mars
Schiaparelli EDM lander, a Mars lander from the 2016 ExoMars mission

See also
 Schiapparelli